Gun Hill Road is a 2011 drama film directed by Rashaad Ernesto Green and starring Esai Morales. The title of the film derives from the Bronx road of the same name. The film is notable for starring a transgender character who is played by a transgender actor, Harmony Santana, who was the first openly transgender actress to be nominated for an Independent Spirit Award.

Premise
Ex-con Enrique (Esai Morales) returns home after a stint in prison. His wife Angela has had an affair while he was away, and his daughter Vanessa, who is a young trans woman in the process of transitioning and coming out, is navigating her life through a bigoted environment, leaving Enrique with decisions to make regarding his family's future.

Cast
 Esai Morales as Enrique
 Judy Reyes as Angela
 Harmony Santana as Vanessa
 Isiah Whitlock, Jr. as Thompson
 Míriam Colón as Gloria
 Felix Solis as Pete
 Franky G as Tico
 Vincent Laresca as Hector
 Robert Prescott as Mr. Donovan
 Robin de Jesús as Robin
 Shirley Rumierk as Jeanette

Reception

Critical reception
The film has received mixed reviews. On review aggregator website Rotten Tomatoes, the film holds an approval rating of 65% based on 31 reviews, and an average rating of 6.06/10. The critical consensus reads: "Equal parts absorbing and educational, Gun Hill Road wears its heart on its sleeve through tender performances that make up for its narrative familiarity". On Metacritic, the film has a weighted average score of 55 out of 100, based on 14 critics, indicating "mixed or average reviews".

Kirk Honeycutt of The Hollywood Reporter said in his review: "In his feature debut, Gun Hill Road, writer-director Rashaad Ernesto Green displays compassion for his characters and an ability to create strong scenes to underscore his thematic concerns. But the story itself is too shopworn especially at Sundance where countless films have presented dysfunctional families where parents and offspring are at odds". Dennis Harvey of Variety similarly said; "script and direction tend to telegraph all events, draining the competently packaged pic of tension, nuance and surprise".

The subject matter of the movie was noted "for the casualness with which it puts a Hispanic transsexual in a black male's bed" because this kind of relationship is rarely seen in movies.

Awards and nominations
Director Rashaad Ernesto Green was nominated for the Grand Jury Prize at the Sundance Film Festival.

Awards/Nominations

Independent Spirit Awards
2012, Best Supporting Actress: Harmony Santana (Nominee)

See also 
 List of hood films

References

External links
 
 Official Site

2011 films
Films shot in New York (state)
Films set in the Bronx
American LGBT-related films
2011 LGBT-related films
LGBT-related drama films
Hispanic and Latino American drama films
Hispanic and Latino American LGBT-related films
Films about trans women
2010s English-language films
2010s American films